Clifton School is a historic elementary school located at Baltimore, Maryland, United States. It is a late 19th-century school with an early 20th-century addition. The structure combines a gable-roofed, "T"-plan, brick county school built in 1882 with a Colonial Revival, flat-roofed, rectangular-plan, brick city school addition built in 1915.

Clifton School was listed on the National Register of Historic Places in 1982.

References

External links
, including photo from 1982, at Maryland Historical Trust

Coldstream-Homestead-Montebello, Baltimore
Defunct schools in Maryland
Buildings and structures in Baltimore
Colonial Revival architecture in Maryland
School buildings on the National Register of Historic Places in Baltimore
School buildings completed in 1882